Mike McCabe (born May 23, 1960) is a political reform activist in Wisconsin. He worked for 15 years as executive director of the Wisconsin Democracy Campaign and founded Blue Jean Nation, a nonpartisan group that describes itself as "commoners working to house the politically homeless and transform parties that are failing America."

On September 12, 2017, McCabe announced that he would run as a Democrat in the 2018 Wisconsin gubernatorial election, stating that it was in response to a letter from 190 Wisconsinites urging him to run. McCabe placed fifth in the primary election.

Early life and career
McCabe was born in Stoughton, Wisconsin and lived on an 80-acre farm near Evansville in the early part of his childhood. He grew up on a 200-acre farm outside of Curtiss for most of his upbringing. McCabe is a 1978 graduate of Owen-Withee High School, which inducted him into its Alumni Hall of Fame in 2014, and a 1982 graduate of the University of Wisconsin School of Journalism, which honored him with its Distinguished Service Award in 2015.

Mike worked for six years as communications director and legislative liaison for Madison public schools. He also worked as a newspaper reporter and as a legislative aide for three Republican members of the Wisconsin State Assembly. In addition, he served with his wife in the Peace Corps in the West African country of Mali. For 15 years, McCabe was the head of the Wisconsin Democracy Campaign, a group that lobbies for having taxpayers finance political campaigns to reduce the influence of special interests. He routinely called out Republicans and Democrats.

McCabe's group was influential in banning the legislative caucus staff that performed campaign work on state time. He also helped pass laws that created a public financing system for state Supreme Court races and established the nonpartisan Government Accountability Board to oversee elections and ethics laws — though both those laws were later repealed by Scott Walker. With McCabe as executive director, the Wisconsin Democracy Campaign tracked campaign contributions during state elections in pursuit of its mission, which is to "advocate for a real democracy that allows the common good to prevail over narrow interests by reinforcing and protecting the values of honesty, fairness, transparency, accountability, citizen participation, competition, and respect for constitutional rights and the rule of law."

2018 gubernatorial campaign
McCabe announced his political committee "Commoners for Mike McCabe" and gubernatorial run in July 2017. McCabe ran as a Democrat once before, against Mark Pocan for the state Assembly in 1998.

Books
In 2014, McCabe published Blue Jeans in High Places sharing his view of Wisconsin state politics, which he regards as corrupt and highly influenced by political financiers and lobbyists.

References

External links
Campaign website

Living people
1960 births
Wisconsin Democrats
People from Stoughton, Wisconsin
People from Evansville, Wisconsin
People from Clark County, Wisconsin